This is a list of books in the English language which deal with Jersey and its geography, history, inhabitants, culture, biota, etc.

Anderson, O. D. – Analysing Time Series: Proceedings of the International Conference Held in Guernsey, Channel Islands, in October 1979.
Ansted, David Thomas and Robert Gordon Latham – The Channel Islands. 
A Bibliographical Guide to the Law of the United Kingdom, the Channel Islands, and the Isle of Man. 
Balleine's History of Jersey - Marguerite Syvret and Joan Stevens (1998) 
Cruickshank, Charles – The German Occupation of the Channel Islands. 
Dobson, Roderick – The Birds of the Channel Islands. 
Dumaresq, Philip – Philip Dumaresq’s Map of Jersey.
Dury, G. – The Channel Islands. 
Eagleston, A. J. – The Channel Islands under Tudor Government, 1485-1642: A Study in Administrative History. 
Elliott, B. B. – Jersey: An Isle of Romance.
Fraser, David – The Jews of the Channel Islands and the Rule of Law, 1940-1945: 'Quite contrary to the Principles of British Justice'. 
Hawkes, Jacquetta – The Archaeology of the Channel Islands, Vol. 2: The Bailiwick of Jersey. 
Horwood, A. R. – A Hand-list of the Lichens of Great Britain, Ireland and the Channel Islands.
Jamieson, A. G. – A People of the Sea: The Maritime History of the Channel Islands.
Jee, Nigel – The Landscape of the Channel Islands.
Jones, R., D. Keen, J. Birnie, and P. Waton – Past Landscapes of Jersey: Environmental Change During the Last Ten Thousand Years.
Keeton, G. W., Dennis Lloyd, and George W. Keeton – The British Commonwealth: The Development of Its Laws and Constitutions, Volume 1: The United Kingdom, Part 2: Scotland and the Channel Islands.
Kendrick, T. D. – The Archaeology of the Channel Islands.
King, Peter – The Channel Islands War, 1940-1945.
L’Amy, John H. – Jersey Folk Lore.
Liddicoat, Anthony – A Grammar of the Norman French of the Channel Islands: The Dialects of Jersey and Sark.
Lockley, R. M. – The Charm of the Channel Islands.
Maxwell, W. Harold and Leslie F. Maxwell – A Legal Bibliography of the British Commonwealth of Nations, Volume 1: English Law to 1800, including Wales, the Channel Islands and the Isle of Man.
Morris, Joseph E. – Beautiful Britain: The Channel Islands.
Perrin, William F., Bernd Würsig & J. G. M. Thewissen – Encyclopedia of Marine Mammals. 
Peterson, C. D., D. A. Pearlman, T. D. Dines, H. R. Arnold, and Jane M. Croft – New Atlas of the British & Irish Flora: An Atlas of the Vascular Plants of Britain, Ireland, the Isle of Man and the Channel Islands.
Ramisch, Heinrich – Variation of English in Guernsey/Channel Islands.
Ramsey, Winston G. – The War in the Channel Islands: Then and Now.
Richard, John D. and David McClintock – Wild Flowers of the Channel Islands.
Sheridan, L. A. – The United Kingdom: The Development of Its Laws and Constitution: The Channel Islands.
Sinel, Joseph – Prehistoric Times and Men of the Channel Islands.
Spence, N. C. – A Glossary of Jersey-French.

La Haule editions
La Haule Books published a limited edition series of at least 38 Jersey Heritage Editions in the 1980s and 1990s. (The numbers in brackets below are the numbers of copies printed).

Jersey Folklore – John H. L'Amy, 1983 (750)
Jersey Through the Centuries: A Chronology of Events and Matters of Interest – Leslie Sinel, 1984 (750)
The German Occupation of Jersey, the Complete Diary of Events from June 1940 to June 1945 – Leslie Sinel, 1984 (750)
Jersey Sea Stories – Philip Ahier, 1984 (750)
L'Archipel de la Manche/The Channel Islands – Victor Hugo/John W. Watson, 1985 (999)
Three Years Behind Barbed Wire, the Diary of a British Internee in ‘Schloss Wurzach’, Germany  – Joan Coles, 1985 (750)
Jersey Remembered, a Miscellany of Memories and Nostalgia – Brian Skelley and Jack Clarke, 1985 (750)
Jersey in Jail – Horace Wyatt and Edmund Blampied, 1985 (750)
These Haunted Islands, a Story of Witchcraft in the Channel Islands – Chris Lake, 1986 (999)
Dame of Sark, an Autobiography – Sibyl Hathaway, 1986 (750)
Architecture in Jersey – Maurice Boots, 1986 (750)
Jersey in Pre-history – Mark Patton, 1987 (750)
Stories of Jersey Ships – John Jean, 1987 (750)
Jersey on the Move – Luke Le Moignan, 1987 (750)
Images of the Past – Chris Lake and Leslie Sinel, 1987 (750)
Children of the Isles, 1988 (750)
Jersey Ships and Railways – John Jean, 1989 (750)
A Picture of Jersey or Stranger's Companion Through that Island – John Stead, 1989 (750)
Glimpses of Jersey’s Past – Luke Le Moignan, 1990 (750)
In a Jersey Garden – Veronica Platt, 1990 (750)
Memoires of a Jerseyman – Ralph Vibert, 1991 (999)
Impressions of the Channel Islands – Hans Max Von Aufsess/F.J. Turpin, 1991 (750)
Lest we Forget, Escapes and Attempted Escapes from Jersey During the German Occupation 1940-1945 – Roy Thomas, 1992 (750)
The Occupation Bicycle Park – H.E. Aubin, 1992 (750)
A Biographical Dictionary of Jersey, volume I – George Reginald Balleine, 1993 (750)
A Biographical Dictionary of Jersey, volume II – George Reginald Balleine, 1993 (750)
The Battle of the Strong, a Romance of Two Kingdoms – Gilbert Parker, 1898 (750)
Perverse and Foolish, a Jersey Farmer's Son in the British Diplomatic Service – Sir Arthur de la Mare, 1994 (750)
Tales of Jersey's Tall Ships – Jean John, 1994 (750)
Remember When...? – Daff Noel, 1995 (?)
Blood and Stones,  an Autobiography – Arthur Ernest Mourant; Gary P. Misson,  1995 (750)
Jersey’s Roadside Heritage – John Jean, 1996 (750)
The Way to the Bay — Jackie de Gruchy, 1996 (?)
A Merry Going Round – Betty Brooke, 1997 (750)
Caesarea, General History and Description of the Island of Jersey from the Time of Julius Caesar to the Present Period – John Stead, 1997 (750)
Footprints on a Winding Road, Recollections of an Old Jerseyman – Arthur Frederick Abbott Stamberg LVO, 1998 (750)
The Occupation of Jersey Day by Day, the personal diary of Deputy Edward Le Quesne member of the States of Jersey Superior Council 1940-1945 – Edward Le Quesne; Michael Ginns,  1999 (750)

Footnotes

Jersey
Jersey
Books about the Channel Islands